OCESA Seitrack (formerly Seitrack Management and Seitrack Musica) is a Mexican record label and talent agency which is a subsidiary of Grupo CIE.

History
Seitrack Management was an independent private talent agency founded in 2002, originally as just a talent agency. OCESA Entertainment, a division of Grupo CIE, joined forces with Seitrack, formally changing the latter's name to OCESA-Seitrack.

Officials
 Alex Mizrahi (CEO)
 Octavio Padilla (General Director)
 Roberto Rodríguez, Yolo Aguilar, Teresa González de la Concha (Marketing Subdirectors)
 Javier Montemayor (Sales Subdirector)
 Miguel Angel Ruiz (Sales Subdirector)
 Mariana Gonzalez (Commercial Alliances Subdirector)
 Enrique García-Salgado (Digital Strategies Subdirector)
 Carlos Moreno, Francisco Sierra, Renato Francis, Layla Del Razo, Fernando de la Garza (Marketing Managers)
 Marisol Márquez (Administrative Manager)
 Gisa Montalvo (Sales Manager)

Artists
Personal:

Recording
Ana Torroja
 María José

Management
Alejandro Fernández
Ana Torroja
Bronco
Christian Nodal
Edith Márquez
Ha*Ash
Horacio Palencia
Karla Vallín
Karol Sevilla
Kinky
Los Ángeles Azules
María Jose
María Leon
Miguel Bosé
Moenia
Morat
Paty Cantú
Río Roma
Sandra Echeverría
Trapical Minds
Ximena Sariñana
Yahir
Yuridia
Zoé

See also
 Grupo CIE
 List of record labels

References

External links
 

Talent agencies
Mexican record labels